The 53rd Electronic Warfare Group was a component of the 53rd Wing of the Air Force Warfare Center, Air Combat Command, headquartered at Eglin Air Force Base, Florida.

The group was responsible for providing operational, technical and maintenance electronic warfare (EW) expertise for the combat air forces  and for systems engineering, testing, evaluation, tactics development, employment, capability and technology assessment. This includes the wartime responsibility for emergency reprogramming and dissemination of EW system mission data software for combat aircraft. The group managed the Combat Shield Electronic Warfare Assessment Program for combat aircraft EW systems. Combat Shield provides operational units a system-specific capability assessment for their radar warning receivers, electronic attack pods, and integrated EW systems.

Established in 1941, the unit traces its lineage and heritage the 68th Strategic Reconnaissance Group; the 68th Air Refueling Group; the 68th Bombardment Wing, Heavy, and the 68th Electronic Combat Group.

History

World War II
The group was first established as the 68th Observation Group in 1941 at Brownwood Army Air Field, Texas, on 1 September 1941. Its primary mission was observation aircraft training and antisubmarine patrols. The group moved to several different U.S. locations in preparation for overseas deployment in 1942.

It moved to the Mediterranean Theater of Operations (MTO), October–November 1942, and became part of Twelfth Air Force. Shortly after the group began operations most of its squadrons were detached for separate duty in order to carry out diverse activities over a wide area. Operating from bases in North Africa until November 1943, the group, or elements of the group, engaged in patrolling the Mediterranean; strafing trucks, tanks, gun positions, and supply dumps to support ground troops in Tunisia; training fighter pilots and replacement crews; and flying photographic and visual reconnaissance missions in Tunisia, Sicily, and Italy to provide information needed to adjust artillery fire.

The group moved to Italy and became part of Fifteenth Air Force in November 1943. It continued visual and photographic reconnaissance and began flying weather reconnaissance missions in Italy, France, Germany, Austria, Hungary, and the Balkans. Also engaged in electronic-countermeasure activities, investigating radar equipment captured from the enemy, flying ferret missions along the coasts of Italy and southern France, and accompanying bomber formations to detect approaching enemy fighters. Inactivated in 1944,

Strategic reconnaissance
The unit trained in the Reserve as the 68th Reconnaissance Group at Hamilton Field (later Hamilton AFB), California between, 1947–1949, when it was inactivated as a result of Continental Air Command's reorganization of its flying units under the Wing Base (Hobson) plan and its personnel transferred to units of the 349th Troop Carrier Wing.

The 68th Strategic Reconnaissance Wing was activated by Strategic Air Command (SAC) on 10 October 1951, with an initial cadre of 16 people from the 44th Bombardment Wing. The group was assigned as a subordinate unit to the new wing at Lake Charles Air Force Base, Louisiana. The wing was assigned to the 37th Air Division of Second Air Force. The group was activated as the 68th Strategic Reconnaissance Group, but it was a paper unit, with token personnel assigned on additional duty to keep it active and with its flying squadrons controlled by the wing.  Support organizations for the wing were also activated, but they were located at Lockbourne AFB, Ohio and were not controlled by the wing.

It was not until May 1952 that the wing received Boeing RB-29 Superfortress aircraft. Its primary mission was gathering intelligence on the Soviet Union.  In June the group was discontinued entirely.  Under SAC's new Dual Deputate organization, squadrons all flying and maintenance squadrons were directly assigned to the wing, so no operational group element was needed.  It added a Boeing KC-97 refueling mission in November 1953.

Strategic bombardment

Medium Bomber era
The wing replaced its propeller-driven RB-29s with new Boeing B-47E Stratojet swept-wing medium bombers in October 1953 and was redesignated as the 68th Bombardment Wing. The B-47 was capable of flying at high subsonic speeds and primarily designed for penetrating the airspace of the Soviet Union. Becoming operationally ready with the B-47 in May 1954, the wing conducted strategic bombardment training and air refueling to meet SAC's global commitments. The wing performed Reflex deployments to RAF Fairford, England from 14 June to 7 August 1954 and to RAF Brize Norton, England from 27 September 1957 to 8 January 1958. The B-47s were reaching the end of their operational lifetime in the late 1950s, and the wing's aircraft were sent to Davis-Monthan Air Force Base in April 1963 with the closure of Chennault AFB.  With the closing of Chennault, and in order to retain the lineage of 379th, Headquarters SAC received authority from Headquarters USAF to move the 68th without personnel or equipment to Seymour Johnson Air Force Base, North Carolina on 15 April where it replaced the 4241st Strategic Wing, which could not carry a permanent history or lineage

Heavy Bombardment era

4241st Strategic Wing

SAC had organized the 4241st Strategic Wing at Seymour Johnson on 1 October 1958 and assigned it to Second Air Force as part of SAC's plan to disperse its Boeing B-52 Stratofortress heavy bombers over a larger number of bases, thus making it more difficult for the Soviet Union to knock out the entire fleet with a surprise first strike. The wing remained a headquarters only until 1 December 1959 when the 911th Air Refueling Squadron, flying Boeing KC-135 Stratotankers, three maintenance squadrons, and a squadron to provide security for special weapons were activated and assigned to the wing.

On 5 January 1959 the 73rd Bombardment Squadron, consisting of 15 Boeing B-52 Stratofortresses moved to Seymour Johnson from Ramey Air Force Base, Puerto Rico where it had been one of the three squadrons of the 72nd Bombardment Wing and the wing was transferred from Second Air Force to the 822nd Air Division. The wing was fully organized at the start of May when the 53rd Aviation Depot Squadron' moved from Barksdale Air Force Base, Louisiana to oversee the wing's special weapons. Starting in 1960, one third of the squadron's aircraft were maintained on fifteen-minute alert, fully fueled and ready for combat to reduce vulnerability to a Soviet missile strike.  This was increased to half the squadron's aircraft in 1962. The 4241st (and later the 68th) continued to maintain an alert commitment until the end of the Cold War.  In 1962, the wing's bombers began to be equipped with the GAM-77 Hound Dog and the GAM-72 Quail air-launched cruise missiles, The 4134th Airborne Missile Maintenance Squadron was activated in November to maintain these missiles.

68th Bombardment Wing, Heavy
When the 68th replaced the 4341st the 53rd Munitions Maintenance Squadron and the 911th Air Refueling Squadron were reassigned to the 68th. The 4241st's maintenance and security squadrons were replaced by ones with the 68th numerical designation. Each of the new units assumed the personnel, equipment, and mission of its predecessor.

The wing continued to conduct strategic bombardment training and global refueling operations to meet SAC commitments. Wing aircraft, most aircrews and maintenance personnel, and other support personnel were loaned to other SAC units for combat operations in Southeast Asia, 27 May 1972 – 15 July 1973.

Air refueling
In 1982 the B-52Gs of the wing were retired and the 68th Wing became the 68th Air Refueling Group. Elevated back to wing status in 1986, the 68th Air Refueling Wing participated in combat operations in Grenada (Operation Urgent Fury) in October 1983, in Libya (Operation Eldorado Canyon) in April 1986, and in Panama (Operation Just Cause) in December 1989. It deployed to Spain to provide airlift and air refueling during Operation Desert Shield/Desert Storm from August 1990 to March 1991.

The 68th Air Refueling Wing was inactivated on 22 April 1991 as part of the objective wing reorganization of the Air Force, which called for one wing on a base.  Its 911th Air Refueling Squadron was reassigned to the 4th Wing.  Its support organizations were inactivated and their personnel and equipment assigned to elements of the 4th Wing or transferred,

The 1990s and twenty-first century
The group was activated again on 15 April 1993 as the 68th Electronic Combat Group. It provided operational and technical electronic combat expertise for US combat air forces from 1993 to 1998 when it was inactivated and replaced by the 53rd Electronic Warfare Group due to USAF policy that groups carry the same number as their parent wing. Two years later the 68th was consolidated with the 53rd that had replaced it. The group performed electronic warfare technology assessments; tested, developed, managed, and maintained electronic warfare systems hardware and software to meet Combat Air Force mission requirements.  In June 2021, the group was inactivated and its assets were used to form the 350th Spectrum Warfare Wing.

Lineage
68th Electronic Combat Group
 Constituted as 68th Observation Group on 21 August 1941
 Activated on 1 September 1941
 Redesignated 68th Reconnaissance Group on 31 May 1943
 Redesignated 68th Tactical Reconnaissance Group on 13 November 1943
 Disbanded on 15 June 1944
 Reconstituted and redesignated 68th Reconnaissance Group, on 10 March 1947
 Activated in the Reserve on 9 April 1947
 Inactivated on 27 June 1949
 Redesignated 68th Strategic Reconnaissance Group, Medium on 4 October 1951
 Activated on 10 October 1951
 Inactivated on 16 June 1952
 Redesignated 68th Air Refueling Group, Heavy on 17 March 1982
 Activated on 30 September 1982
 Consolidated with the 68th Bombardment Wing, Heavy on 1 October 1982
 Redesignated 68th Air Refueling Wing, Heavy on 1 October 1986
 Inactivated on 22 April 1991
 Redesignated 68th Electronic Combat Group on 9 April 1993
 Activated on 15 April 1993
 Inactivated on 20 November 1998
 Consolidated with the 53rd Electronic Warfare Group on 25 July 2000 as the 53rd Electronic Warfare Group

68th Bombardment Wing
 Constituted as 68th Strategic Reconnaissance Wing, Medium on 4 October 1951
 Activated on 10 October 1951
 Redesignated 68th Bombardment Wing, Medium on 16 June 1952
 Redesignated: 68th Bombardment Wing, Heavy on 15 April 1963
 Organized on 15 April 1963
 Inactivated on 30 September 1982
 Consolidated with the 68th Air Refueling Group on 1 October 1982 as the 68th Air Refueling Group

53rd Electronic Warfare Group
 Constituted on 1 November 1998 as 53rd Electronic Warfare Group 
 Activated on 20 November 1998
 Consolidated with the 68th Electronic Warfare Group on 25 July 2000
 Inactivated c. 25 June 2021

Assignments
68th Group, 1941–1952

 3rd Air Support Command, 1 September 1941
 Third Air Force, 17 March 1942
 III Ground Air Support Command, 19 May 1942
 Attached to 3rd Demonstration Air Task Force [Provisional], c. 12 June 1942 – unknown
 VIII Ground Air Support Command, c. 18–22 June 1942
 VIII Ground Air Support Command, 23 June 1942
 III Ground Air Support Command, c. 4 June 1942
 Third Air Force, 21 August 1942
 III Ground Air Support Command, 24 August 1942
 XII Air Support Command, c. 18 October 1942 (attached to 5th Bombardment Wing after 31 October 1942)
 Northwest African Tactical Air Force, c. 18 June 1943 (attached to 5th Bombardment Wing)
 XII Training Command, c. March 1943 (attached to 5th Bombardment Wing)
 XII Bomber Command, 18 October 1943 (attached to 5th Bombardment Wing)
 Fifteenth Air Force, 1 November 1943 – 15 June 1944 (attached to 5th Bombardment Wing to 4 December 1943, attached to 47th Bombardment Wing, 4 December 1943 – 24 May 1944)
 325th Reconnaissance Wing (later, 325th Air Division), 10 March 1947 – 27 June 1949
 68th Strategic Reconnaissance Wing, 10 October 1951 – 16 June 1952

68th Wing, 1951–1982

 37th Air Division, 10 October 1951 (attached to 21st Air Division until c. 15 May 1952)
 Second Air Force, 28 May 1952
 806th Air Division, 16 June 1952 (attached to 7th Air Division), 14 June – 7 August 1954; 27 September 1957 – 8 January 1958)
 825th Air (later, 825th Strategic Aerospace) Division), 15 June 1960
 822nd Air Division, 15 April 1963
 57th Air Division, 1 July 1964
 822nd Air Division, 1 July 1965
 57th Air Division, 2 September 1966
 823rd Air Division, 2 July 1969
 42nd Air Division, 30 June 1971 – 30 September 1982

Consolidated Organization
 42nd Air Division, from consolidation in 1982
 Eighth Air Force, 16 June 1988 – 22 April 1991
 USAF Air Warfare Center (later, 53rd Wing), 15 April 1993 – 20 November 1998
 53rd Wing, 20 November 1998 - c. 25 June 2021

Components
68th Group, 1941–1952
 15th Observation Squadron: 12 December 1941 – 2 February 1942
 16th Observation (later, 16th Reconnaissance) Squadron: attached February–March 1942, assigned 29 March 1942 – 26 May 1944 (detached 25 September 1943 – 26 May 1944)
 24th Reconnaissance, Very Long Range (Photographic) (later, 24th Strategic Reconnaissance, Medium (Photographic) Squadron): 12 July 1947 – 27 June 1949; 10 October 1951 – 16 June 1952 (detached 10 October 1951 – 16 June 1952)
 51st Reconnaissance, Weather (later, 51st Strategic Reconnaissance, Photographic) Squadron: 1 August 1947 – 27 June 1949; 10 August 1951 – 16 June 1952 (detached 10 October 1951 – 16 June 1952)
 52nd Reconnaissance, Weather Scouting (later, 52nd Strategic Reconnaissance, Photographic) Squadron: 12 July 1947 – 27 June 1949; 10 October 1951 – 16 June 1952 (detached 10 October 1951 – 16 June 1952)
 68th Air Refueling Squadron: 8 April – 28 May 1952
 111th Observation (later, 111th Reconnaissance, Fighter; 111th Tactical Reconnaissance): attached February–March 1942, assigned 29 March 1942 – 26 May 1944 (detached 12 March 1943 – 26 May 1944)
 122nd Observation (later, 122nd Liaison; 885th Bombardment): 1 October 1941 – 15 June 1944
 125th Observation: 15 September 1941 – 12 March 1942
 127th Observation: 6 October 1941 – 12 March 1942
 154th Observation (later, 154th Reconnaissance; 154th Tactical Reconnaissance; 154th Weather Reconnaissance): 1 September 1941 – 15 June 1944 (detached 12 March 1943 – 15 June 1944)

68th Wing, 1951–1982
 68th Air Base Group (later 68th Combat Support Group): 14 February 1952 – 28 May 1952, 15 June 1960 – 15 April 1963
 68th Maintenance & Supply Group: 10 October 1951 – 16 June 1952
 68th Strategic Reconnaissance Group: 10 October 1951 – 16 June 1952
 24th Strategic Reconnaissance, Photographic (later, 24th Bombardment) Squadron: attached 10 October 1951 – 15 June 1952, assigned 16 June 1952 – 16 January 1953
 51st Strategic Reconnaissance, Photographic (later, 51st Bombardment) Squadron: attached 10 October 1951 – 15 June 1952, assigned 16 June 1952 – 30 September 1982
 52nd Strategic Reconnaissance, Photographic (later, 52nd Bombardment) Squadron: attached 10 October 1951 – 15 June 1952, assigned 16 June 1952 – 15 April 1963
 68th Air Refueling Squadron: attached 8 April – 28 May 1952; assigned 25 November 1953 – 3 September 1957
 656th Bombardment Squadron: 16 January 1953 – 15 April 1963
 657th Bombardment Squadron: 1 December 1958 – 1 January 1962
 911th Air Refueling Squadron: 15 April 1963 – 30 September 1982
 32nd Munitions Maintenance Squadron: 1 July 1960 – 15 April 1963
 53rd Munitions Maintenance Squadron: 15 April 1963 – 30 September 1972
 68th Medical Squadron (later 68th Medical Group, 68th Tactical Hospital): 10 October 1951 – 15 February 1952, 16 June 1952 – 1 December 1958
 68th Airborne Missile Maintenance Squadron: 1 February 1963 – 30 June 1974
 68th Armament & Electronics Maintenance Squadron (later 68th Avionics Maintenance Squadron): 16 June 1952 – 30 September 1982
 68th Maintenance Squadron (later 68th Field Maintenance Squadron, 68th Consolidated Aircraft Maintenance Squadron): 16 June 1952 – 1 April 1991
 68th Munitions Maintenance Squadron, 1 October 1972 – 30 September 1982
 68th Periodic Maintenance Squadron (later 68th Organizational Maintenance Squadron): 16 June 1952 – 30 September 1982
 4068th Armament & Electronics Maintenance Squadron: 10 October 1951 – 16 June 1952
 4068th Organizational Maintenance Squadron: 10 October 1951 – 16 June 1952

Consolidated organization
 16th Test (later, 16th Electronic Warfare) Squadron: 15 April 1993 – 20 November 1998, 20 November 1998 – c. 25 June 2021
 36th Engineering and Test (later, 36th Electronic Warfare) Squadron: 15 April 1993 – 20 November 1998, 20 November 1998 – c. 25 June 2021
 39th Electronic Warfare Squadron: c. 23 July 2020 – c. 25 June 2021
 51st Bombardment Squadron: 30 September – 1 October 1982
 53rd Computer Systems Squadron: 13 September 1999 – 1 October 2002
 68th Test Support Squadron (later 68th Electronic Warfare Squadron): 15 April 1993 – 20 November 1998, 20 November 1998 – c. 25 June 2021
 84th Test Squadron: 1 December 1991 – 15 April 1993
 87th Electronic Warfare Aggressor Squadron (later 87th Electronic Warfare Squadron): 15 April 1993 – 1 July 1997, c. 17 May 2019 – c. 25 June 2021
 344th Air Refueling Squadron: 1 October 1986 – 22 April 1991
 453rd Electronic Warfare Squadron: Unknown – c. 25 June 2021
 513th Electronic Warfare Squadron: 1 April 2010 – c. 25 June 2021
 911th Air Refueling Squadron: 30 September 1982 – 22 April 1991

Stations

 Brownwood Army Air Field, Texas, 1 September 1941
 New Orleans Army Air Base, Louisiana, 17 December 1941
 Daniel Field, Georgia, 8 February 1942
 Smith Reynolds Airport, North Carolina, 9 July 1942
 Morris Field, North Carolina, c. 17 August – 18 October 1942
 Casablanca Airfield, French Morocco November 1942
 Oujda Airfield, French Morocco c. November 1942
 Berrechid Airfield, French Morocco 24 March 1943
 Berteaux Airfield, Algeria 5 September 1943
 Massicault Airfield, Tunisia October 1943
 Manduria Airfield, Italy November 1943
 Blida Airfield, Algeria, November 1943-15 June 1944
 Hamilton Field (later, Air Force Base), California, 9 April 1947 – 27 June 1949
 Lake Charles (later, Chennault) Air Force Base, Louisiana, 10 October 1951
 Seymour Johnson Air Force Base, North Carolina, 15 April 1963 – 30 September 1982; 30 September 1982 – 22 April 1991
 Eglin Air Force Base, Florida, 15 April 1993 – 20 November 1998, 20 November 1998 – c. 25 June 2021

Aircraft
68th Group

1941–1952: O-38, 1941–1942; O-46, 1941–1942; O-47, 1941–1942; O-49, 1941–1942; YO-50, 1941–1942; O-52, 1941–1942; O-57, 1941–1942; O-58, 1941–1942; O-59, 1941–1942; A-20, 1942–1943; DB-7, 1942; L-4, 1942; O-43, 1942; P-39, 1942–1943; P-40, 1942–1943; P-43, 1942; A-36, 1943; B-17, 1943–1944; P-38, 1943; P-38/F-4, 1943; P-51, 1943; P-51/F-6, 1943; Spitfire, 1943. A-6, 1947–1949; A-7, 1947–1949; A-11, 1947–1949.

68th Wing

1951–1982: B-29, 1952–1953; B-47, 1953–1963; KC-97, 1953–1957; B-52, 1963–1972, 1973–1982; KC-135, 1963–1972; 1973–1985.

Consolidated organization: KC-10, 1982–1991; KC-135, 1982–1991. None, 1993–1998

See also

 List of B-29 units of the United States Air Force
 List of B-47 units of the United States Air Force
 List of B-52 Units of the United States Air Force
 List of MAJCOM wings of the United States Air Force

References

Notes
 Explanatory notes

 Citations

Bibliography

 
 
 
 

53
Military units and formations established in 1998